Qualifying for UEFA Women's Euro 2009 determined which 11 teams joined Finland, the hosts of the 2009 tournament, to play for the UEFA Women's Championship.

Preliminary round
20 teams were divided into 5 groups of 4. The 5 group winners qualified for the actual qualifying stage, together
with 25 countries exempted from the preliminary round.

Group A1
in Turkey:

Group A2
in Bosnia and Herzegovina:

Group A3
in Luxembourg:

Group A4
in Romania:

Group A5
in Macedonia:

Qualifying stage

The six group winners automatically qualified for the final tournament. The six group runners-up and the four third-placed teams with the best record against the rest of the top four in their respective groups went into five two-legged play-offs.

Group 1

Group 2

Group 3

Group 4

Group 5

Group 6

Third-placed teams

Play-offs

First legs

Second legs

Iceland won 4–1 on aggregate

Italy won 3–1 on aggregate

Aggregate score 4–4; Russia won on away goals rule

Netherlands won 4–0 on aggregate

Ukraine won 5–0 on aggregate

Top goalscorers

External links
Women's Euro 2009 – UEFA Official Page
Tables & results at RSSSF.com

Qual
Women
Women
2009
UEFA
UEFA
UEFA